The Gilroy Garlic Festival was a food festival in the United States, held annually from 1979 to 2019 at Christmas Hill Park in Gilroy, California, on the last full weekend in July. After cancellation in 2020 due to the COVID-19 pandemic, a drive-through festival was held on July 23–25 and 30–31 July and August 1, 2021. In April 2022, the Gilroy Garlic Festival Association announced the indefinite suspension of the traditional large-format festival, and that it would instead host smaller individual events. In May 2022, the festival was canceled permanently.

An annual three-day event, the Gilroy Garlic Festival was one of the country's best known food festivals, drawing visitors from across the nation. The festival was Gilroy's top fundraiser, staffed with volunteers to raise money for nonprofit groups including clubs and schools.

History

The inaugural Garlic Festival was held in 1979. Rudolph J. Malone, then President of Gavilan College in Gilroy, was inspired by a small town in France which hosted an annual garlic festival and claimed to be the "Garlic Capital of the World." Malone started the festival, which attracted more than hundreds of thousands of paying visitors a year.

2019 shooting

On July 28, 2019, a mass shooting occurred at the 41st edition of the festival. Three people were killed, in addition to the gunman, and 12 others were injured.

COVID-19 pandemic and cancellation
The festival was cancelled in 2020 due to the COVID-19 pandemic, while 2021 saw a drive-thru festival. In April 2022, the Gilroy Garlic Festival Association announced that the event will be canceled indefinitely due to prolonged losses, "lingering uncertainties from the pandemic," and "prohibitive insurance requirements by the City of Gilroy" since the 2019 shooting. The association reportedly announced it would instead hold smaller events spread throughout the year. The festival is now confirmed to be canceled indefinitely.

Appearances in popular culture
The Garlic Festival was featured by Huell Howser in Road Trip Episode 124.

Gallery

See also

Isle of Wight Garlic Festival
Garlic ice cream

References

Sources
 Gilroy Garlic Festival.  Retrieved January 19, 2007.
 The Gilroy Garlic Festival, 2005.
 Garlic festival tidbits, 2006.
 The Origin of the Gilroy Garlic Festival, 2007.

External links 
 

1979 establishments in California
Agriculture in California
Annual events in California
Festivals in the San Francisco Bay Area
Festivals in California
Food and drink festivals in the United States
Food and drink in the San Francisco Bay Area
Garlic
Gilroy, California
Festivals established in 1979
Tourist attractions in Santa Clara County, California